Anvin is a commune in the Pas-de-Calais department in northern France.

Geography
Anvin is a farming village located in the Ternoise river valley, 28 miles (44 km) northwest of Arras, at the junction of the D343, D70 and D94 roads.

Population
The inhabitants are called Anvinois.

Sights
 The church of St. Leger, dating from the sixteenth century.
 The ruins of a seventeenth-century chateau.
 Vestiges of a watermill.

See also
Communes of the Pas-de-Calais department

References

Communes of Pas-de-Calais